Revealed Recordings (or shortened to Revealed, stylized as revealed) is a Dutch record label established by Hardwell in 2010. The label is headquartered in Breda, Netherlands.

History
The label was established on 11 April 2010 by electronic music producer and DJ Hardwell. Revealed mainly focuses on big room house, dance-pop, and electro house.

The label has had some success, including "Apollo" by Hardwell featuring Amba Shepherd, which peaked on No. 26 of the Dutch Top 40; Hardwell's 2014 single "Dare You" was also successful, entering the UK Singles Chart at No. 18. "Dare You" has also been used on adverts for television programs such as Strictly Come Dancing.

In 2015 Revealed launched a radio show called Revealed Radio, hosted by a different artist from the label each week, starting with Hardwell. The label has over 200 track releases.

In 2016, Revealed released an a cappella pack to celebrate six years of their establishment.

In 2018, Revealed announced that there will be a new sublabel of Revealed, titled Gemstone Records. The label will focus on the pop side of electronic music.

In 2019 it was announced that Revealed would host a stage at Ultra Music Festival in 2020 on the UMF Radio stage, celebrating Revealed's 10 year anniversary.

Artists

References

External links

Dutch record labels
Electronic dance music record labels
House music record labels
Record labels established in 2010